The Baishajia Lighthouse or Paisha Chia Lighthouse is a lighthouse in Guanyin District, Taoyuan City, Taiwan.

History
The lighthouse was established in 1901 as the third lighthouse built in Taiwan under Japanese rule with an original height of 38 meters. However, the upper portion was destroyed during World War II. After the war, the tower was repaired to its current height. In March 2013, it was announced that the lighthouse would be opened for tourists starting September 2013.

Architecture
The lighthouse is a white round brick structure stands at 27.7 meters in height. The focal plane flashes every 10 seconds.

Opening time
The lighthouse is opened from Tuesday to Sunday from 9.00 a.m. to 5.00 p.m. or 6.00 p.m.

See also

 List of tourist attractions in Taiwan
 List of lighthouses in Taiwan

References

External links

 Maritime and Port Bureau MOTC  

1901 establishments in Taiwan
Lighthouses in Taiwan
Lighthouses completed in 1901
Buildings and structures in Taoyuan City
National monuments of Taiwan